Kimberly Denise Jones, known by her stage name Lil' Kim, is an American rapper and singer-songwriter.

Her debut studio album Hard Core was released on November 12, 1996 in the United States, by the Atlantic subsidiary Big Beat Records, followed by her second album The Notorious K.I.M. on June 27, 2000. Lil' Kim's third studio album, La Bella Mafia, was released on March 4, 2003, and her latest album The Naked Truth on September 27, 2005.

Throughout Lil' Kim's career, she has received several awards and nominations. In 1998, Kim received recognition from the MTV Music Video Awards, winning an award for viewer's choice alongside The Notorious B.I.G. and Puffy. That same year, Kim received a nomination for Best Rap Performance by a Duo or Group for her single "Not Tonight" at The Grammys.

On March 27, 2001, Lil' Kim, Christina Aguilera, Pink, and Mýa recorded a cover version of the Labelle song, "Lady Marmalade" as a medley for the feature film Moulin Rouge!. The single produced Kim's first Grammy Award in 2002 for Best Pop Collaboration with Vocals, along with several other awards and nominations from the MTV Awards which garnered 2 awards from 6 nominations.

Her single "How Many Licks?" gained her a nomination from the "Soul Train Awards" for "Best R&B/Soul or Rap Music Video". It also received a nomination from "The Source Awards" for "Music Video of The Year". Lil' Kim's third studio album, La Bella Mafia, produced Lil Kim two Grammy Award nominations in 2004, one for her single "Came Back For You" for Best Female Rap Solo Performance, and "Magic Stick" with 50 Cent for Best Rap Performance by a Duo or Group. As of 2013, Kim has been nominated for three World Music Awards.

American Music Awards
The American Music Awards is an annual music awards ceremony and one of several major annual American music awards shows. Lil' Kim has received 3 nominations.

|-
| style="text-align:center;"| 2003
| style="text-align:center;" rowspan="2"| Lil' Kim
| style="text-align:center;" rowspan="2"| Favorite Rap/Hip-Hop Female Artist
| 
|-
| style="text-align:center;"| 2005
| 
|}

ASCAP Rhythm & Soul Awards

	
|-
| style="text-align:center;" rowspan="2"| 1996
| style="text-align:center;" rowspan="2"| "Player's Anthem" (with The Notorious B.I.G.)
| style="text-align:center;" rowspan="1"| Award Winning Rap Songs	
| 	
|-	
| style="text-align:center;" rowspan="1"|Award Winning R&B Songs	
|	
|-	
| style="text-align:center;" rowspan="2"| 1997
| style="text-align:center;" rowspan="2"| "Get Money" (with Junior M.A.F.I.A.)	
| style="text-align:center;" rowspan="1"| Award Winning  Rap Songs 
|		
|-	
| style="text-align:center;" rowspan="1"|Award Winning R&B Songs		
|			
|}

BET
The BET Awards were established in 2001 by the Black Entertainment Television network to celebrate African Americans and other minorities in music, acting, sports, and other fields of entertainment over the past year. Lil' Kim Has been nominated 7 times.

BET Awards

|-
| style="text-align:center;"| 2001
| style="text-align:center;" rowspan="2"| Lil' Kim
| style="text-align:center;" rowspan="2"| Best Female Hip-Hop Artist
| 
|-
| style="text-align:center;"| 2006
| 
|-
| style="text-align:center;" rowspan="2"| 2008
| style="text-align:center;" rowspan="2"| "Let It Go" 
| style="text-align:center;"| Best Collaboration
| 
|-
| style="text-align:center;"| Viewers Choice
| 
|-
| style="text-align:center;"| 2010
| style="text-align:center;" rowspan="2"|  Lil' Kim
| style="text-align:center;" rowspan="2"|  Best Female Hip-Hop Artist
| 
|-
| style="text-align:center;" rowspan="2"| 2016
|
|-
| style="text-align:center;" rowspan="1"| Puff Daddy & The Family
| style="text-align:center;" rowspan="2"| Best Group
|
|-
|}

BET Hip-Hop Awards

|-
| style="text-align:center;"| 2019
| style="text-align:center;" rowspan="1"| Lil' Kim
| style="text-align:center;" rowspan="1"| I Am Hip-Hop
|
|-
|}

BDB Spin Awards

|-
| style="text-align:center;" rowspan="4"| 2003
| style="text-align:center;" rowspan="2"| "The Jump Off"
| style="text-align:center;" rowspan="1"| BDS Certified Spin Award (100,000 spins)
| 
|-
| style="text-align:center;" rowspan="1"| BDS Certified Spin Award (50,000 spins)
| 
|-
| style="text-align:center;" rowspan="1"| "Magic Stick" 
| style="text-align:center;" rowspan="1"| BDS Certified Spin Award (200,000 spins)
| 
|-
| style="text-align:center;"| "Can't Hold Us Down" 
| style="text-align:center;" rowspan="1"| BDS Certified Spin Award (100,000 spins)
| 
|-
| style="text-align:center;" rowspan="1"| 2005
| style="text-align:center;" rowspan="1"| "Sugar (Gimme Some)" 
| style="text-align:center;" rowspan="1"| BDS Certified Spin Award (200,000 spins)
| 
|-
| style="text-align:center;"| 2006
| style="text-align:center;"| "Lady Marmalade" 
| style="text-align:center;" rowspan="1"| BDS Certified Spin Award (300,000 spins)
|
|-
|}

Billboard

Billboard Music Awards

|-
| style="text-align:center;" rowspan="1"|1995
| style="text-align:center;" rowspan="1"|"Player's Anthem" (with Junior M.A.F.I.A.)
| style="text-align:center;" rowspan="2"|Best New Artist Clip 
|
|-
| style="text-align:center;" rowspan="2"| 1997
| style="text-align:center;"|"No Time" 
|
|-
| style="text-align:center;"| Lil' Kim
| style="text-align:center;"| Female R&B/Hip-Hop Artist of the Year
|
|-
| style="text-align:center;"|1998
| style="text-align:center;"|"Its All About The Benjamins" 
| style="text-align:center;"|Best Rap Clip
|
|-
| style="text-align:center;" rowspan="4"| 2002
| style="text-align:center;" rowspan="2"| "Lady Marmalade" 
| style="text-align:center;"| Best Dance Clip of the Year
|
|-
| style="text-align:center;"|Director Of The Year
|
|-
| style="text-align:center;"| "How Many Licks?" 
| style="text-align:center;"| Best Rap/Hip-Hop Clip of the Year
|
|}

BMI

BMI Urban Awards

|-
| style="text-align:center;"| 2005
| style="text-align:center;"| "Magic Stick" 
| style="text-align:center;" rowspan="2"| Award Winning Songs
| 
|-
| style="text-align:center;"| 2008
| style="text-align:center;"| "Let It Go" 
| 
|}

BMI Pop Awards

|-
| style="text-align:center;"| 2005
| style="text-align:center;"| "Magic Stick" 
| style="text-align:center;"| Most Performed Songs
| 
|-
|}

BMI Film & TV Awards

|-
| style="text-align:center;"|2002
| style="text-align:center;"|"Lady Marmalade" (with Christina Aguilera, Pink & Mýa)
| style="text-align:center;" rowspan="1"| Most Performed Song from a Film 
|  
|-

|}

Channel [V] Thailand Music Video Awards

|-
| style="text-align:center;"| 2002
| style="text-align:center;"| "Lady Marmalade" (with Christina Aguilera, Pink, Mya)
| style="text-align:center;"| Popular Group Video 
|
|}

Coke Juice Awards

|-
| style="text-align:center;"| 2001
| style="text-align:center;"| "Lady Marmalade" (with Christina Aguilera, Pink, Mya)
| style="text-align:center;"| Best R&B Video
|
|}

City Of West Hollywood

|-
| style="text-align:center;"| 2012
| style="text-align:center;"| Herself
| style="text-align:center;"|Key To The City 
|
|-
|}

Girls' Choice Awards

|-
| style="text-align:center;" rowspan="1"|2019
| style="text-align:center;"| "Can't Hold Us Down" 
| style="text-align:center;"| Most Empowering Classic Girl Power Anthem 
|
|-
|}

Grammy Awards
A Grammy Award (originally called Gramophone Award) – or Grammy – is an accolade by the National Academy of Recording Arts and Sciences of the United States to recognize outstanding achievement in the music industry. The annual presentation ceremony features performances by prominent artists, and some of the awards of more popular interest are presented in a widely viewed televised ceremony. It is the music equivalent to the Emmy Awards for television, the Tony Awards for stage performances, and the Academy Awards for motion pictures. Kim Has received 6 nominations and won a Grammy for Best Pop Collaboration with Vocals.

|-
| style="text-align:center;"| 1998
| style="text-align:center;"| "Not Tonight" 
| style="text-align:center;"| Best Rap Performance by a Duo or Group
| 
|-
| style="text-align:center;"| 2002
| style="text-align:center;"| "Lady Marmalade" 
| style="text-align:center;" rowspan="2"| Best Pop Collaboration with Vocals
| 
|-
| style="text-align:center;" rowspan="3"| 2004
| style="text-align:center;"| "Can't Hold Us Down" 
| 
|-
| style="text-align:center;"| "Came Back for You"
| style="text-align:center;"| Best Female Rap Solo Performance
| 
|-
| style="text-align:center;"| "Magic Stick" 
| style="text-align:center;"| Best Rap Performance by a Duo or Group
| 
|-
| style="text-align:center;"| 2008
| style="text-align:center;"| "Let It Go" 
| style="text-align:center;"| Best Rap/Sung Collaboration
| 
|}

Groovevolt Music & Fashion Awards

|-
| style="text-align:center;" rowspan="4"| 2004
| style="text-align:center;"| "Can't Hold Us Down" 
| style="text-align:center;"| Most Fashionable Music Video
| 
|-
| style="text-align:center;"| "When Kim Say (Can You Hear Me Now)"
| style="text-align:center;"| Best Hip-Hop Deep Cut (Unreleased Album Track)
| 
|-
| style="text-align:center;"| "La Bella Mafia"	
| style="text-align:center;"| Best Hip-Hop Album – Female	
| 	
|-	
| style="text-align:center;"| "Magic Stick" 	
| style="text-align:center;"| Best Hip-Hop Collaboration
| 
|}

Inspiring Our Children to Dream Awards
Founded in Los Angeles in 1999, the Inspiring Our Children to Dream Awards are held each year by Children Uniting Nations and are presented during their Oscar viewing party. The annual event serves as a platform to raise funds that support Children Uniting Nation's mission to serve the at risk youth and foster children in their community. Lil' Kim was awarded the Crystal Dove Award at the 8th annual viewing party in 2007 and also serves as a Goodwill Ambassador for the cause.

|-
| style="text-align:center;"| 2007
| style="text-align:center;"| Lil' Kim
| style="text-align:center;"| Crystal Dove Award
| 
|}

Juice TV Awards

!
|-
| style="text-align:center;"| 2001 || "Lady Marmalade"  || Best R&B Video ||  || align="center" rowspan="3"|
|-

MOBO Awards

|-
| style="text-align:center;"| 1998
| style="text-align:center;"| Puff Daddy and the Family
| style="text-align:center;"| Best International Act
| 
|-
| style="text-align:center;"| 2003
| style="text-align:center;"| Lil' Kim
| style="text-align:center;"| Fashion Icon Award
| 
|}

MTV

MTV Music Video Awards Japan

|-
| style="text-align:center;" rowspan="1"| 2002
| style="text-align:center;" rowspan="1"| "Lady Marmalade" 
| style="text-align:center;"| Best Video from a Film
| 
|}

MTV Europe Music Awards
The MTV Europe Music Awards ("EMAs") were established in 1994 by MTV Networks Europe to celebrate the most popular music videos in Europe. The MTV Europe Music Awards is today a popular celebration of what MTV viewers consider the best in music. The awards are chosen by MTV viewers. Lil' Kim Had been nominated for Lady Marmalade.

|-
| style="text-align:center;"| 2001
| style="text-align:center;"| "Lady Marmalade" 
| style="text-align:center;"| Best Song
| 
|}

MTV Asia Awards

|-
| style="text-align:center;"| 2002
| style="text-align:center;"| "Lady Marmalade"
| style="text-align:center;"| Favorite Video
| 
|}

MTV Video Music Awards 
An MTV Video Music Award is an award to honor the best in the music video medium. Lil' Kim Has won 3 awards.

|-
| rowspan="2" style="text-align:center;"| 1998
| rowspan="2" style="text-align:center;"| "All About The Benjamins" (Rock Remix) 
| style="text-align:center;"| Viewers Choice
| 
|-
| style="text-align:center;" rowspan="2"| Video of the Year
| 
|-
| rowspan="6" style="text-align:center;"| 2001
| rowspan="6" style="text-align:center;"| "Lady Marmalade" 
| 
|-
| style="text-align:center;"| Best Pop Video
| 
|-
| style="text-align:center;"| Best Video from a Film
| 
|-
| style="text-align:center;"| Best Choreography in a Video
| 
|-
| style="text-align:center;"| Best Art Direction in a Video
| 
|-
| style="text-align:center;"| Best Dance Video
| 
|}

Music Video Production Association Awards
	
|-	
| style="text-align:center;"| 1997	
| style="text-align:center;"| "It's All About The Benjamins"  	
| style="text-align:center;"| Best Urban/R&B Video of the Year	
| 	
|-	
| style="text-align:center;" rowspan="2"| 2001	
| style="text-align:center;" rowspan="2"| "How Many Licks" (with Sisqo)	
| style="text-align:center;"| Best Hip-Hop Video Of The Year 	
|	
|-	
| style="text-align:center;" rowspan="1"| Best Hair In A Music Video 	
|	
|-	
| style="text-align:center;" rowspan="2"| 2002	
| style="text-align:center;" rowspan="2"| "Lady Marmalade" 	
| style="text-align:center;"| Best Styling in a Video	
| 	
|-	
| style="text-align:center;"| Best Soundtrack Video	
| 
|-
	
|}

National Film & Television Awards

New York Magazine Awards
New York Music Awards is an annual awards ceremony and live concert, established in 1986. Lil' Kim won her first nomination from the New York Music Awards.

|-
| style="text-align:center;"| 1999
| style="text-align:center;"| Lil' Kim
| style="text-align:center;"| Artist of the Year
| 
|}

Online Film & Television Association

|-
| style="text-align:center;"| 2001
| style="text-align:center;"| Lady Marmalade
| style="text-align:center;"| Best Music, Adapted Song
| 
|-
|}

Peoples Choice Awards

|-
| style="text-align:center;" rowspan="2"| 2004
| style="text-align:center;" rowspan="2"| Carwash 
| style="text-align:center;"| Favorite Remake 
|
|-
| style="text-align:center;"| Favorite Combined Forces 
|
|-
|}

Power of Influence Awards

|-
| style="text-align:center;"| 2018
| style="text-align:center;"| Herself
| style="text-align:center;"| Honouree 
| 
|}

Radio Music Awards

|-
| style="text-align:center;"| 2001
| style="text-align:center;"| "Lady Marmalade" 
| style="text-align:center;"| Top 40 Pop Radio Song of the Year
| 
|-
| style="text-align:center;"| 2003
| style="text-align:center;"| "Magic Stick" 
| style="text-align:center;"| Song of the Year/Hip Hop Radio
| 
|-
|}

Sister 2 Sister Intergenerational Celebration
Starting in 1999, Sister 2 Sister Magazine's Annual Intergenerational Celebration pairs hip-hop and R&B singers with various politicians and business professionals from across the country and honors those that contribute to African-American culture. Kim was paired with Debra L. Lee and was awarded the "You're My Sis" award in 2002.

|-
| style="text-align:center;"| 2002
| style="text-align:center;"| Lil' Kim
| style="text-align:center;"| "You're My Sis" Award
| 
|-
|}

Soul Train
Soul Train Music Awards is an annual award show aired in national broadcast syndication that honors the best in African American music and entertainment established in 1987. Lil' Kim has won 2 awards by Soul Train.

Lady of Soul Awards

|-
| style="text-align:center;"| 1997
| style="text-align:center;"| "Crush on You" 
| style="text-align:center;" rowspan="3"| Best R&B/Soul or Rap Music Video
| 
|-
| style="text-align:center;"| 1998
| style="text-align:center;"| "Not Tonight" 
| 
|-
| style="text-align:center;"| 2001
| style="text-align:center;"| "How Many Licks?" 
| 
|}

Soul Train Awards

|-
| style="text-align:center;"| 1996
| style="text-align:center;"| Junior M.A.F.I.A.
| style="text-align:center;"| Best R&B/Soul or Rap New Artist
| 
|-
| style="text-align:center;" rowspan="1"| 1998
| style="text-align:center;"| Hard Core
| style="text-align:center;"| Best R&B/Soul Album – Female
| 
|}

Teen Choice Awards

|-
| style="text-align:center;"| 2001
| style="text-align:center;"| "Lady Marmalade" 
| style="text-align:center;"| Choice Song of the Summer
| 
|-
|}

The Source Awards
The first live Source Hip-Hop Music Awards show was held in 1994. Lil' Kim has received 8 nominations at the Source Awards.

|-
| style="text-align:center;"|2000
| style="text-align:center;"| "Quiet Storm (Remix)" 
| style="text-align:center;"| Single of the Year
| 
|-
| style="text-align:center;"|2001
| style="text-align:center;"| "How Many Licks?" 
| style="text-align:center;"|  Music Video of the Year
| 
|-
| style="text-align:center;" rowspan="5"|2003
| style="text-align:center;"|Lil' Kim
| style="text-align:center;"|Female Artist of the Year
| 

|-
| style="text-align:center;"| "The Jump Off" 
| style="text-align:center;"| Female Single of the Year
| 

|-
| style="text-align:center;"| "Magic Stick" 
| style="text-align:center;"| Fat Tape Song of the Year
| 

|-
| style="text-align:center;"| La Bella Mafia
| style="text-align:center;"| Album of the Year
| 

|-
| style="text-align:center;"| Lil' Kim
| style="text-align:center;"| Trendsetter of the Year
| 
|-
| style="text-align:center;" rowspan="1"| 2004
| style="text-align:center;" rowspan="1"| "Naughty Girl" 
| style="text-align:center;" rowspan="1"| Best Female Rap Collaboration
|
|}

The Source

|-
| style="text-align:center;"|2005
| style="text-align:center;"| The Naked Truth
| style="text-align:center;"| 5 Mics 
|
|-
|}

The Music Factory Awards

|-
| style="text-align:center;" rowspan="1"| 2001
| style="text-align:center;" rowspan="1"| "Lady Marmalade" 
| style="text-align:center;" rowspan="1"| Beste Clip
|
|-
|}

Urban Music Awards

|-
| style="text-align:center;"|2004
| style="text-align:center;"| "The Jump Off"
| style="text-align:center;"| Best Night Club Song
|
|}

VIBE Awards
Beginning in 2003, Vibe produced and aired its annual awards show on UPN through 2006, and VH1 Soul in 2007.

|-
| style="text-align:center;"|2003
| style="text-align:center;"| "Magic Stick" 
| style="text-align:center;"| Coolest Collabo
|
|-
| style="text-align:center;"|2005
| style="text-align:center;"| "The Naked Truth"
| style="text-align:center;"| Album of the Year
| 
|}

VH1 Awards

|-
| style="text-align:center;" rowspan="4"|2001
| style="text-align:center;" rowspan="3"| "Lady Marmalade" 
| style="text-align:center;"| My VH1 Favorite Video 
| 
|-
| style="text-align:center;"| My VH1 Music Award for Is It Hot in Here Or Is It Just My Video?
| 
|-
| style="text-align:center;" rowspan="2"| There's No "I" in Team  
| 
|-
| style="text-align:center;"| "What's Going On"
|
|-
| style="text-align:center;" rowspan="1"|2002
| style="text-align:center;"| Lil' Kim
| style="text-align:center;"| Shakespeare in Da Hiz-Zouse 
| 
|}

VH1 Hip-Hop Honors

|-
| style="text-align:center;" rowspan="1"|2016
| style="text-align:center;"| Lil' Kim
| style="text-align:center;"| Honoree 
|
|-
|}

WEEN Awards

|-
| style="text-align:center;" rowspan="1"|2016
| style="text-align:center;"| Lil' Kim
| style="text-align:center;"| Icon Award 
|
|-
|}

World Music Awards

|-
| style="text-align:center;" rowspan="3"|2013
| style="text-align:center;" rowspan="3"| Lil' Kim 
| style="text-align:center;"| Worlds Best Female Artist 
|
|-
| style="text-align:center;"| Worlds Best Live Act 
|
|-
| style="text-align:center;"| Worlds Best Entertainer of The Year 
|
|-
|}

References

Lil'Kim
Awards